The Fair may refer to:

The Fair (film), a 1960 German drama
The Fair Store, in Illinois, US

See also
List of people known as the Fair